Charissa Tansomboon (born January 30, 1989 in Silver Spring, Maryland, United States) is former a Thai-American figure skater who competed internationally for Thailand. Her parents moved to the U.S. from Thailand just before she was born. She is the 2005 Thai national platinum medalist and is a two-season competitor on the Junior Grand Prix circuit.

References

External links 

 
 https://www.linkedin.com/in/charissatansomboon

Charissa Tansomboon
American female single skaters
1989 births
Living people
People from Silver Spring, Maryland
People from Stanford, California
Figure skaters at the 2007 Asian Winter Games
Competitors at the 2009 Winter Universiade
American sportspeople of Thai descent